José Eugenio Acosta (17 August 1942 – 31 July 2006) was an Argentine equestrian. He competed in the 1968 and 1972 Summer Olympics.

References

External links
 

1942 births
2006 deaths
Equestrians at the 1968 Summer Olympics
Equestrians at the 1972 Summer Olympics
Argentine male equestrians
Olympic equestrians of Argentina
Sportspeople from Buenos Aires